Patrick David Stier (born 1954) is a Canadian politician, who is an elected member to the Legislative Assembly of Alberta, representing the electoral district of Livingstone-Macleod. He sat with the Official Opposition as a member of the United Conservative Party and was the Municipal Affairs Critic.

Political career
Stier has 30 years farming experience and 15 years of service with municipal government, including four years as a municipal councillor with Municipal District of Foothills #31 in 2004–2007. He was also co-chair of the Subdivision and Development Appeal Board at MD of Foothills #31. In the 2012 election, Stier defeated Progressive Conservative candidate and Agriculture minister Evan Berger, who went on to be hired as a senior policy advisory to the deputy Agriculture minister.

As an MLA, Stier has spoken out against the Alberta Health Services policy of separating married seniors in nursing homes. Stier and Wildrose Party Leader Danielle Smith criticized the Provincial Government for cancelling plans to build the Alberta Public Security and Law Enforcement Training college in Fort Macleod.

In the 2013 spring sitting, Stier brought forward Motion 507 to repeal the Alberta Land Stewardship Act and create a new land use framework “that better protects the rights of landowners and respects the role of locally elected and accountable municipal councils.” The motion did not pass. He was reelected in the 2015 Alberta general election, once again facing Berger as a PC challenger.

In July, 2017 Stier remained the MLA for Livingstone-Macleod under the establishment of The United Conservative Party (UCP). The UCP is a political party which forms the official opposition in Alberta, Canada. It was established in July 2017 as a merger between the Progressive Conservative Association of Alberta and the Wildrose Party.

Professional career
Stier was raised on the family ranch near De Winton, where his family raised Arabian horses and Angus cattle as well as farmed crops. He has lived in the Foothills area of Alberta all of his life.  He attended junior high and high school in Okotoks, graduating in 1972. He was employed primarily in the seismic data segment of the oil and gas industry for 25 years in Calgary.

Electoral history

2012 general election

2015 general election

References

Wildrose Party MLAs
1950s births
Canadian oilmen
Living people
21st-century Canadian politicians
United Conservative Party MLAs